Paliokastro is a former municipality in the Trikala regional unit, Thessaly, Greece. Since the 2011 local government reform it is part of the municipality Trikala, of which it is a municipal unit. It is located in the east-northeastern part of the regional unit. Its population was 2,732 at the 2011 census, and it has a land area of 197.878 km². The seat of the municipality was in the town of Palaiopyrgos (pop. 904). Its largest other towns are Krinítsa (pop. 596), Zilevtí (483), Ardáni (374), and Agreliá (184).

References

Populated places in Trikala (regional unit)

el:Δήμος Τρικκαίων#Παληοκάστρου